The Libyan Arab Force, also known as the known as the Sanusi Army, consisting of five infantry battalions made up of volunteers, was established to aid the British war effort. With the exception of one military engagement near to Benghazi, this force's role did not extend beyond support and gendarmerie duties. It was initially known as the British Arab Force and was renamed the Cyrenaica Defence Force in March 1943.

Following the outbreak of World War II in 1939, Idris of Libya supported the United Kingdom—which was now at war with Italy—in the hope of ridding his country of Italian occupation. He argued that even if the Italians were victorious, the situation for the Libyan people would be no different than it had been before the war. Delegates from both the Cyrenaicans and Tripolitanians agreed that Idris should conclude agreements with the British that they would gain independence in return for support during the war. 

Vladimir Peniakoff was commissioned as a second lieutenant served in the Libyan Arab Force. before creating a unit known as Popski's Private Army.

Shortly after Italy entered the war, a number of Libyan leaders living in exile in Egypt called on their compatriots to organise themselves into military units and join the British in the war against the Axis powers. Five battalions, which were initially designed for guerrilla warfare in the Jabal al Akhdar region of Cyrenaica, were established under British command. Because the high mobility of the desert campaigns required a considerable degree of technical and mechanical expertise, the Libyan forces were used primarily as auxiliaries, guarding military installations and prisoners. One battalion, however, participated in the fighting at the Siege of Tobruk (April-November 1941).

After Britain succeeded in occupying the Libyan territories, the need for the British-trained and equipped Sanusi troops appeared to be over. The Sanusi Army was reluctant to disband, however, and the majority of its members arranged to be transferred to the local police force in Cyrenaica under the British military administration. It was finally disbanded in August and September 1943. When Libya gained its independence in 1951, veterans of the original Sanusi Army formed the nucleus of the Royal Libyan Army.

The roots of the 1951–2011 Libyan armed forces can be traced to the Libyan Arab Force (popularly).

References

Bibliography

Further reading

External links
The Libyan Arab Force during the Second World War at The National Archives (United Kingdom)

Libya in World War II
Military units and formations established in 1939
Libya–United Kingdom relations
Italian Libya